Hrastulje is a settlement just northeast of Škocjan in the historical region of Lower Carniola in southeastern Slovenia. Within the municipality, it belongs to the Local Community of Škocjan. The Municipality of Škocjan is included in the Southeast Slovenia Statistical Region.

References

External links
Hrastulje at Geopedia

Populated places in the Municipality of Škocjan